Johan Edin (born 9 February 1987) is a Swedish cross-country skier and ski orienteering competitor. He was born in Sundsvall.

He competed in the World Cup 2014 and 2015 seasons.

At the Junior World Ski Orienteering Championships in Salzburg in 2007, he won a bronze medal in the sprint competition, as well of being part of the Swedish winning team in the relay.

Cross-country skiing results
All results are sourced from the International Ski Federation (FIS).

World Championships

World Cup

Season standings

References

External links
 

1987 births
Living people
Swedish male cross-country skiers
People from Sundsvall